Poonam Ahluwalia (February 14, 1957 - October 21, 2019) was a social entrepreneur and founder and director of Youth Entrepreneurship and Sustainability (YES), an international nonprofit organization and Youth Trade, an organization promoting youth entrepreneurship, based at Babson College in Wellesley, MA.

Early years
Poonam Ahluwalia was born and raised in an affluent family in Jaipur, India on February 14, 1957. After she graduated from high school Ahluwalia taught basic hygiene in small schools and neighborhoods.

Early career
After receiving her M.A. in political science from Rajasthan University in Jaipur, India, Ahluwalia worked as the marketing manager of a chain of pizzerias called “Pizza King”. She moved to the United States in 1985 and began providing household help for a family in Brookline to pay for her education at Boston University. She attended Boston University in pursuit of a master’s in mass communications, which she received in 1989.

Ahluwalia began working for The Hunger Project in 1984. She became involved when she was introduced to Werner Erhard, the Founder of The Hunger Project when he came to India to launch the organization. During her work with The Hunger Project, Ahluwalia raised funds and awareness of the issue, as well as helped launch Ending the Subjugation of Women as a Critical Step to Ending Hunger.  For about three to four years she helped raise over $100,000 a year through an annual event that they held – many times at Ahluwalia’s own home. Ahluwalia also organized a dance with Jothi Raghavan and two walkathons in Lexington to raise funds.

By the late 1980s,  Ahluwalia also began to work for Welfare-to-Work programs under the administration of Massachusetts governor Michael S. Dukakis.

In 1997 Ahluwalia began to work with the Education Development Center (EDC) based in Newton, MA. With funding from USAID, she was able to create workforce development workshops to promote global learning, health, and education. In association with EDC Ahluwalia ran workshops in Peru, India, and Namibia. While the workshops were hugely successful, Poonam became aware of the issue of youth unemployment based on the feedback she received directly from participants. With this feedback in mind, Ahluwalia founded YES in 1998.

During her work with EDC Ahluwalia also had some contact with SEWA (All Indian Federation of Self-Employed Women’s Association)

Work with YES 
As the founder and director of YES, Ahluwalia launched a 10-year campaign in 2002 with the purpose of creating accessible education and opportunities to youth around the world. The initiative was launched in Alexandria, Egypt at an international summit on youth employment sponsored by the United Nations Industrial Development Organization (UNIDO). The summit was co-chaired by former president Bill Clinton, and first lady of the Arab Republic of Egypt, Suzanne Mubarak.

Ahluwalia helped start YES country networks in 55 countries with the goal of building the national capacity to ensure that 2 million youth become entrepreneurs by 2012. The way that YES manifests itself is different in each country network based on the conditions for growth. The organization's vision is specifically focused on the "triple bottom line" of people, planet, profits. 

In total Ahluwalia organized five YES international summits, in Alexandria, Egypt (2002), Veracruz, Mexico (2004), Nairobi, Kenya (2006), Baku, Azerbaijan (2008), and Leksand, Sweden (2010) and three YES Regional Summits in Hyderabad, India (2003), Asunción, Paraguay (2005), Dominican Republic (2006) and Panama City, Panama (2008). YES’ empowering approach has proven successful, as after the summits there have been more than 400 youth employment projects worldwide.

Ahluwalia has been recognized by the California Legislature and the Indian-American Trade and Commerce Council for her work as “an outstanding youth community leader”. In 2003 she was nominated for the South Asian Woman of the Year Award by the India New England News.

YES currently focuses on encouraging the use of renewable energy, the implementation of information and communication technology, campaigns against HIV and AIDS, the growth of rural development and development of water sanitation.

Youth Trade and later years
In 2012, Ahluwalia launched Youth Trade, an organization aimed at promoting entrepreneurship and combatting unemployment by aligning conscious premium retailers with young, mission-driven entrepreneurs.  YouthTrade has certified over 50 entrepreneurs.  These entrepreneurs have gained access to shelf space in stores across the United States by participating in Youth Trade shows, where entrepreneurs meet one on one with buying teams from Whole Foods Markets to present their products.  As of November 2013, the trade shows have led to Youth Trade entrepreneur's products being placed in the Mid-Atlantic, North Atlantic, Northeast, South, Southwest, Pacific Northwest, Northern California, and Southern Pacific regions of Whole Foods Markets.

Youth Trade is partnered with Whole Foods Markets and Babson College, and operates out of Lexington, MA, and Wellesley, MA.

In June 2013, Ahluwalia was given the 2013 India New England Woman of The Year Award, in recognition of her work towards ending youth unemployment.  On October 19, 2013, Ahluwalia delivered the keynote address at the 7th Annual Forum for Social Entrepreneurship. In November 2013, she participated in the World Economic Forum's 2013 Summit on the Global Agenda in Abu Dhabi, serving on the Global Youth Unemployment Council.

Ahluwalia lived in Lexington, MA with her husband and two children. She died on October 21, 2019 after suffering from cancer.

References

External links 
 Yesweb
 Education Development Center
 Rework the World
 

2019 deaths
1957 births
Indian humanitarians
Social entrepreneurs
Ahluwalia